Patty Lewis is a Missouri politician serving in the Missouri House of Representatives since 2021, she was a nurse before being elected.

Missouri House of Representatives

Committee assignments 

 Conservation and Natural Resources
 Health and Mental Health Policy
 Professional Registration and Licensing
 Rural Community Development

Source:

Electoral history

References

Living people
21st-century American politicians
Year of birth missing (living people)
Democratic Party members of the Missouri House of Representatives
Women state legislators in Missouri
21st-century American women politicians